Yuxarı Fərəcan is a village in the Lachin District of Azerbaijan.

References

See also
Aşağı Fərəcan, "Lower Fərəcan"

Villages in Azerbaijan
Populated places in Lachin District